Oranje Hein is a 1925 Dutch silent film directed by Alex Benno.

Cast
 Johan Elsensohn - Hein de Klopper alias Oranje Hein
 Aaf Bouber - Aal, vrouw van Hein
 Maurits de Vries - Thijs
 Vera van Haeften - Ant, vrouw van Thijs
 Marie Van Westerhoven - Moeder van Ant
 August Van den Hoeck - Vader van Ant
 Heintje Davids - Naatje Visch
 Pauline Hervé
 Riek Kloppenburg - (as Rika Kloppenburg)
 Marie Schafstad
 Elize le Maire
 Jetty Kremer
 Anton Gerlach
 Piet Fuchs
 Harry Boda

External links 
 

1925 films
Dutch silent feature films
Dutch black-and-white films
Films directed by Alex Benno